William McMahon known as Bill McMahon is a former Hong Kong international lawn bowler.

Bowls career
McMahon has represented Hong Kong at two Commonwealth Games; in the fours event at the 1990 Commonwealth Games and in the pairs event at the 1994 Commonwealth Games.

He won a triples silver medal at the Asia Pacific Bowls Championships in Lae, Papua New Guinea.

Personal life
His wife Rosemary McMahon is also an international lawn bowler and his son is Mark McMahon.

References

Hong Kong male bowls players
Living people
Bowls players at the 1990 Commonwealth Games
Bowls players at the 1994 Commonwealth Games
Year of birth missing (living people)